Gongylidiellum is a genus of  dwarf spiders that was first described by Eugène Louis Simon in 1884.

Species
 it contains eighteen species, found in Algeria, Angola, Argentina, China, Georgia, India, Japan, Mongolia, Nepal, Pakistan, Romania, Russia, Turkey, Turkmenistan, the United States, and Vietnam:
Gongylidiellum blandum Miller, 1970 – Angola
Gongylidiellum bracteatum Zhao & Li, 2014 – China
Gongylidiellum caucasicum Tanasevitch & Ponomarev, 2015 – Russia (Caucasus)
Gongylidiellum confusum Thaler, 1987 – India, Pakistan
Gongylidiellum crassipes Denis, 1952 – Romania
Gongylidiellum edentatum Miller, 1951 – Central, southern Europe
Gongylidiellum hipponense (Simon, 1926) – Algeria
Gongylidiellum kathmanduense Wunderlich, 1983 – Nepal
Gongylidiellum latebricola (O. Pickard-Cambridge, 1871) (type) – Europe, Russia (Europe to West Siberia)
Gongylidiellum linguiformis Tu & Li, 2004 – Vietnam
Gongylidiellum minutum (Banks, 1892) – USA
Gongylidiellum murcidum Simon, 1884 – Europe, Turkey, Russia (Europe to West Siberia), Turkmenistan, Japan
Gongylidiellum nepalense Wunderlich, 1983 – India, Nepal
Gongylidiellum nigrolimbatum Caporiacco, 1935 – Karakorum
Gongylidiellum orduense Wunderlich, 1995 – Turkey, Caucasus (Russia, Georgia)
Gongylidiellum tennesseense Petrunkevitch, 1925 – USA
Gongylidiellum uschuaiense Simon, 1902 – Argentina
Gongylidiellum vivum (O. Pickard-Cambridge, 1875) – Europe, North Africa, Turkey, Caucasus

See also
 List of Linyphiidae species (A–H)

References

Araneomorphae genera
Cosmopolitan spiders
Linyphiidae